The 2015 Commonwealth Heads of Government Meeting, also known as CHOGM 2015 was the 24th Meeting of the Heads of Government of the Commonwealth of Nations. It was held in Malta from 27 to 29 November. Sri Lankan President Maithripala Sirisena handed the position of Commonwealth Chair-in-Office to Maltese prime minister Joseph Muscat at the meeting.

Background
The summit, which was originally designated to be hosted by Mauritius, was given to Malta when the Mauritian Prime Minister Navin Ramgoolam refused to attend the CHOGM 2013 over the human rights situation prevailing in the host country, Sri Lanka, and thus withdrew as the host of the 2015 summit as protocol had required him to attend the summit in order to personally invite other member states.

Venues
The summit was held at various venues in Valletta and Għajn Tuffieħa's Golden Bay with retreats at Fort St. Angelo in Birgu. The opening ceremony and reception were held at the Mediterranean Conference Centre in Valletta with executive and special sessions held at the Radisson Golden Sands at Golden Beach. Most press conferences were being held at the InterContinental Hotel in St. Julian's. The official theme of the event was "The Commonwealth - Adding Global Value". A series of civil society conferences in the form of a People's Forum, Women's Forum, Youth Forum and Business Forum were held in the days leading up to the main summit and explored avenues such as building democracy and rule of law, championing small states, creating economic opportunities, empowering youth, inclusive development, human rights, and public service reform among Commonwealth nations.

Due to poor weather, the official welcoming ceremony for the royal party occurred at San Anton Palace rather than an open air event at St. George’s Square in Valletta as originally planned.

Commonwealth Secretary General election
The meeting elected a new Commonwealth Secretary-General to succeed Kamalesh Sharma who is retiring April 2016 at the end of his second term, the maximum that can be served. Candidates for the position included Antiguan ambassador to the United States and former high commissioner to the United Kingdom Sir Ronald Sanders; former Attorney General for England and Wales Baroness Patricia Scotland, nominated by her native country of Dominica; and former deputy secretary-general for political affairs Mmasekgoa Masire-Mwamba, nominated by Botswana. Furthermore, Alexander Downer, a former Australian foreign minister and Liberal Party leader who currently serves as Australia's High Commissioner to the United Kingdom had been suggested by British and Australian officials as a possible compromise candidate. Trinidad and Tobago's former planning minister Bhoendradatt Tewarie and Tanzanian foreign minister Bernard Membe were both nominees earlier in the process but withdrew as candidates before the summit began. The election took take place on 27 November.

Baroness Patricia Scotland was elected the 6th Commonwealth Secretary-General after two rounds of voting and took office on 1 April 2016. According to Antigua's foreign minister, Charles "Max" Fernandez, while the CARICOM countries largely backed Sir Ronald Sanders over Baroness Scotland, African countries favoured Masire-Mwamabe: "After the first round, Sir Ron received the fewest votes. For the second round, Antigua & Barbuda put its support behind Baroness Scotland because we felt we'd be supporting the candidate from another Caribbean country." Fernandez also asserted that Scotland had the support of "European" and Pacific states. Australia also supported Baroness Scotland after its compromise candidate, Alexander Downer, failed to obtain support. Sanders had been seen as the leading candidate prior to the summit, particularly as the Caribbean Commonwealth countries argued it was their turn to have a secretary-general come from their region, however the failure of the entire CARICOM to support Sanders and a Daily Telegraph article published two days prior to the summit accusing him of corruption may have damaged his campaign.

For the first time in Commonwealth history, the Commonwealth Foundation organised a debate between the candidates as part of the Commonwealth People's Forum. This was held on 25 November - two days before the election - in the Maltese House of Representatives. It was chaired by the Speaker of the House, Angelo Farrugia, who took questions from members of civil society present in the chamber. The three declared candidates at the time of debate - Masire-Mwamba, Sir Ronald and Baroness Scotland - were all present. Two representatives of the Maltese parliament also attended and spoke briefly at the end of the debate.

Agenda

The Commonwealth meeting was held immediately prior to the United Nations Climate Change Conference in Paris. The Commonwealth conference accordingly held a special session on climate change and global sustainability in an attempt to build political support around the issue prior to the Paris summit;
In consideration of small island nations that are being threatened by rising sea levels that accompany climate change, a proposal was discussed to allow these countries to write off their debts in exchange for taking measures to protect the environment.

The summit, being held in the aftermath of the November 2015 Paris attacks and growing conflict with ISIL, also addressed terrorism and security issues and the European migrant crisis, as well as economic and trade issues. corruption, The continued criminalization of homosexuality in 40 of the Commonwealth's 53 members was not on the official agenda but was an issue brought up by civil society groups and was also raised by both Prime Minister Joseph Muscat (chairing the occasion) and British Prime Minister David Cameron during their remarks to the Commonwealth leaders. In addition, newly elected Commonwealth Secretary-General Patricia Scotland, Baroness Scotland of Asthal committed herself to using the first two years of her tenure to promote decriminalization of homosexuality in Commonwealth countries that continue to forbid same-sex relationships. Cameron also pledged to increase cooperation among members to deal with "poisonous ideologies" and violent extremism.

The leaders also chose a new venue for the next summit, originally scheduled for 2017, as Vanuatu, which was originally selected as host, has rescinded its offer to host due to the long-term effects of devastation to the island nation's infrastructure caused by Cyclone Pam in March 2015. It was determined that Britain would host the next CHOGM in London in the spring of 2018, delayed from late 2017 due to other international commitments. Accordingly, the 26th CHOGM that was planned for Malaysia in 2019 was pushed back to 2020.

Attendees
Elizabeth II, as Head of the Commonwealth, along with the Duke of Edinburgh, the Prince of Wales and the Duchess of Cornwall all attended the summit. The summit coincided with a state visit to Malta by Elizabeth II as Queen of the United Kingdom, her first visit to the country since 2007.
 
Secretary-General of the United Nations Ban Ki-Moon and French President François Hollande addressed a special session on climate change. Ban and Nicolas Sarkozy, Hollande's predecessor, had previously attended CHOGM 2009 in Trinidad and Tobago prior to the Copenhagen Summit for the same reason. Indian Prime Minister Narendra Modi was absent from the meeting - his government has opposed arguments that the country should curtail its use of coal fired electrical generation and other greenhouse gases. India was instead represented by External Affairs Minister Sushma Swaraj.

Leaders in attendance included Australian Prime Minister Malcolm Turnbull, Canadian Prime Minister Justin Trudeau, Sri Lankan President Maithripala Sirisena, British Prime Minister David Cameron, Pakistani Prime Minister Nawaz Sharif. At least 15 leaders did not attend the summit and sent cabinet ministers or other officials as representatives including the Tongan Prime Minister Akilisi Pohiva, who absented himself due to health reasons and domestic priorities, Solomon Islands Prime Minister Manasseh Sogavare, who sent his deputy prime minister instead, and Vanuatu Prime Minister Sato Kilman, who could not attend due to a government crisis that resulted in a snap election. Tanzania was represented by its High Commissioner, whilst Kenya was represented by its High Commissioner at the Opening Ceremony as Uhuru Kenyatta did not arrive until the second day of the summit.

Outcomes

Climate change
The leaders agreed on and issued the Commonwealth Leaders’ Statement on Climate Action which called climate change an "existential threat" to many states and called for the upcoming 2015 United Nations Climate Change Conference (COP21) to produce "an ambitious, equitable, inclusive, rules-based and durable outcome ... that includes a legally binding agreement" to reduce greenhouse gas emissions and control climate change. The statement asserted that "many of our most vulnerable states and communities are already facing the adverse impacts of climate change ... (and) for some it represents an existential threat." The leaders also called for developed nations to spend $100 billion a year by 2020 to help developing countries deal with the effects of climate change. To that end, Canada pledged $2.65 billion over five years to help developing countries tackle climate change. The UK committed £21 million for disaster management and £5.5 million for the ocean-based economy whilst Australia has committed $1 million for a new Commonwealth initiative, the Climate Finance Access Hub, and India pledged $2.5 million in assistance. A $1 billion Commonwealth Green Finance Facility, proposed by the Prince of Wales, was also created to support environmental projects among poor Commonwealth nations.

Peace and security
The final Communiqué issued by leaders at the end of the CHOGM also addressed the issues of peace and security, affirming that "radicalisation, violent extremism and terrorism in all its forms and ramifications are serious threats to the whole world" and called upon Commonwealth members to fully implement United Nations Security Council Resolution 2178 (2014) on terrorism and extremism and called for the implementation of "national strategies to counter radicalisation, violent extremism and terrorism" including education and the addressing of grievances and alienation by susceptible individuals, particularly young people. The Commonwealth leaders also agreed to a British proposal to create a new unit of experts to counter extremism. The body will be run by the Commonwealth Secretariat, which will combat radicalisation and terrorist recruitment across the Commonwealth. Australia has committed $2.5 million to the unit in addition to a £5 million by Britain.

The Communiqué also encouraged all countries to accede to and fully implement the Arms Trade Treaty of 2014 in order to curtail the illicit trade in conventional weapons including small arms.

Human rights, good governance, and migration
The statement also reaffirmed commitments to human rights and good governance, and respect for rule of law and democratic principles and "agreed to enhance national and international efforts to address the causes of irregular migration including prevention and abatement of conflict and violent extremism and terrorism; eradicating poverty and promoting sustainable economic development; strengthening the rule of law; nurturing inclusive and pluralist political systems; combatting organised crime, human trafficking and people smuggling, and modern day slavery; and reinforcing respect for human rights" and called for international co-operation and the adherence of international law in regards to migration, calling on "all stakeholders to work towards a lasting solution to this global issue".

Sustainable development
On the issue of sustainable development leaders adopted the 2030 Agenda for Sustainable Development and called for its implementation in the hopes that it would "lead to the eradication of poverty in all its dimensions and ensure no one is left behind" and also agreed to "provide continued assistance to member states in attaining long-term debt sustainability by means of technical advice on institutional strengthening, debt financing, debt strategy formulation and debt restructuring."

Other issues
The Communiqué also touched on the concerns of small states, pledging to advocate internationally on their behalf, trade, in particular pledging to augment access to trade and investment finance for small, vulnerable, or developing states, youth, and the importance of developing youth leadership, gender equality and women's empowerment, calling in particular for continued efforts to "prevent and eliminate child, early and forced marriage and female genital mutilation", public health, underlining the importance of immunization programs to tackle diseases such as malaria and committing states to the eradication of polio as a global priority, and calling "on the Commonwealth
at large to support the strengthening of policies for universal health coverage in order to build strong and resilient health systems that will, in turn, enable better responses to public health threats and emergencies".

The meeting also called for easier movement of Commonwealth citizens between member states.

Country issues
Leaders also welcomed progress on continuing national and regional issues such as improve bilateral relations between Belize and Guatemala and their border disagreement, reaffirmed its call for the implementation of existing United Nations resolutions on the Cyprus dispute, expressed solidarity with Guyana in its ongoing border dispute with Venezuela.

See also
Valletta Summit on Migration
2015 United Nations Climate Change Conference

References

External links
Commonwealth Leaders’ Statement on Climate Action
Commonwealth Heads of Government Leaders’ Communiqué (CHOGM 2015)

2015
Foreign relations of Malta
Malta and the Commonwealth of Nations
2015 in Malta
2015 in international relations
Diplomatic conferences in Malta
2015 conferences
21st-century diplomatic conferences (Commonwealth)
Climate change conferences
21st century in Valletta
November 2015 events in Europe
2015 in the environment